Admiral Strauss may refer to:

Elliott B. Strauss (1903–2003), U.S. Navy rear admiral
Joseph Strauss (admiral) (1861–1948), U.S. Navy admiral
Lewis Strauss (1896–1974), U.S. Navy rear admiral